Yixian railway station is a third-class railway station in Yizhou town, Yi County, Jinzhou, Liaoning. It is located on the Xinlitun–Yixian railway and Jinzhou–Chengde railway. It was built in 1921 and is under the jurisdiction of China Railway Shenyang Group.

References 

Railway stations in Liaoning
Stations on the Jinzhou–Chengde railway
Stations on the Xinlitun–Yixian Railway
Railway stations in China opened in 1921